Arnold John Funk (August 13, 1895 – December 29, 1980) was an American brigadier general and chief of staff to General Edward P. King, commander of the Philippine-American forces, during the Battle of Bataan.

Funk earned a B.S. degree from Oregon Agricultural College in 1916. He was commissioned as an infantry officer in June 1917. Funk served as a temporary captain during World War I.

Funk graduated from the Infantry School advanced course in 1932 and the Command and General Staff School in 1939. He was promoted to major in September 1934 and lieutenant colonel in July 1940.

Sent to the Philippines, Funk received temporary promotions to colonel in December 1941 and brigadier general in January 1942. After surrendering to Japanese forces, he spent over three years as a prisoner of war.

In April 1947, his promotion to colonel was made permanent retroactive to December 1945 and his temporary promotion to brigadier general was renewed. He retired from active duty as a brigadier general on May 31, 1952.

Funk died in Sarasota County, Florida. He was interred at Arlington National Cemetery on May 22, 1981.

See also
57th Infantry Regiment (United States)

References

External links
Generals of World War II

1895 births
1980 deaths
People from Stayton, Oregon
Oregon State University alumni
Military personnel from Oregon
United States Army personnel of World War I
United States Army Command and General Staff College alumni
United States Army generals of World War II
Recipients of the Silver Star
American prisoners of war in World War II
World War II prisoners of war held by Japan
Bataan Death March prisoners
Recipients of the Distinguished Service Medal (US Army)
United States Army personnel of the Korean War
United States Army generals
Burials at Arlington National Cemetery